St. Paul Island Airport  is a state-owned, public-use airport located on St. Paul Island in the Aleutians West Census Area of the U.S. state of Alaska. It is situated near the city of St. Paul, the island's main settlement. Scheduled airline service to Anchorage International Airport is provided by Ravn Alaska.

As per Federal Aviation Administration records, this airport had 3,301 commercial passenger boardings (enplanements) in calendar year 2008, an increase of 8% from the 3,064 enplanements in 2007. St. Paul Island Airport is included in the FAA's National Plan of Integrated Airport Systems (2009–2013), which categorizes it as a general aviation facility.

Facilities and aircraft 
St. Paul Island Airport has one runway designated 18/36 with an asphalt surface measuring 6,500 by 150 feet (1,981 x 46 m). For the 12-month period ending December 31, 2006, the airport had 410 aircraft operations, an average of 34 per month: 63% air taxi, 24% military and 12% general aviation.

Airlines and destinations

References

External links 
 Airport diagram for Saint Paul (SNP) (GIF). FAA, Alaska Region. 10 Jun 2004.
 

Airports in the Aleutians West Census Area, Alaska
Saint Paul Island (Alaska)